Johann Peter Friedrich Ancillon (30 April 1767 – 19 April 1837) was a Prussian historian and statesman. He provided Frederick William III of Prussia with strong ideological support against political reforms that might restrain monarchical power.

Early life
Ancillon was born in Berlin, Kingdom of Prussia, and was the great-grandson of French jurist and diplomat Charles Ancillon. After studying theology at Geneva University, he was appointed minister to the French community in Berlin.

Career 
At the same time, his reputation as a historical scholar secured him the post of professor of history at the military academy. In 1793, he visited Switzerland, and in 1796 France, publishing the impressions gathered during his travels in a series of articles which he afterwards collected under the title of Mélanges de littérature et de philosophie (1801).

Ancillon took rank among the most famous historians of his day by his next work, Tableau des révolutions du système politique de l'Europe depuis le XVe siècle (1803, 4 volumes), which gained him the praise of the Institute of France, and admission to the Military Academy of Berlin. It was the first attempt to recognize psychological factors in historical movements, but otherwise its importance was exaggerated. Its "sugary optimism, unctuous phraseology and pulpit logic" appealed, however, to the reviving pietism of the age succeeding the Revolution, and these qualities, as well as his eloquence as a preacher, brought Ancillon to the notice of the court. In 1808 he was appointed tutor to the royal princes, in 1809 councillor of state in the department of religion, and in 1810 tutor of the crown prince (afterwards Frederick William IV of Prussia), on whose sensitive and dreamy nature he was to exercise a powerful but far from wholesome influence. In October 1814, when his pupil came of age, Ancillon was included by Prince Hardenberg in the ministry, as privy councillor of legation in the department of foreign affairs, with a view to utilizing his supposed gifts as a philosophical historian in the preparation of the projected Prussian constitution. But Ancillon's reputed liberalism was of too invertebrate a type to survive the trial of actual contact with affairs. The practical difficulty of the constitutional problem gave the "court parson", as August von Gneisenau had contemptuously called him, excuse enough for a change of front which, incidentally, would please his exalted patrons. He covered his defection from Hardenberg's liberal constitutionalism by a series of "philosophical" treatises on the nature of the state and of man, and became the soul of the reactionary movement at the Berlin court, and the faithful henchman of Klemens von Metternich in the general politics of Germany and of Europe.

In 1817, Ancillon became a councillor of state, and in 1818 director of the political section of the ministry for foreign affairs under Count Bernstorff. In his chief's most important work, the establishment of the Prussian Zollverein, Ancillon had no share, while the entirely subordinate role played by Prussia in Europe during this period, together with the personal part taken by the sovereign in the various congresses, gave him little scope for the display of any diplomatic talents he may have possessed. During this time he found plentiful leisure to write a series of works on political philosophy, such as the Nouveaux essais de politique et de philosophie (Paris, 1824). In May 1831 he was made an active privy councillor, was appointed chief of the department for the principality of Neuchâtel, in July became secretary of state for foreign affairs, and in the spring of 1832, on Bernstorff's retirement, succeeded him as head of the ministry.

By the German public, to whom Ancillon was known only through his earlier writings and some isolated protests against the "demagogue-hunting" in fashion at Berlin, his advent to power was hailed as a triumph of liberalism. They were soon undeceived. Ancillon had convinced himself that the rigid class distinctions of the Prussian system were the philosophically ideal basis of the state, and that representation "by estates" was the only sound constitutional principle; his last and indeed only act of importance as minister was his collaboration with Metternich in the Vienna Final Act of 12 June 1834, the object of which was to rivet this system upon Germany forever. When he died, he was the last of his family. His historical importance lies neither in his writings nor in his political activity, but in his personal influence at the Prussian court, and especially in its lasting effect on the character of Frederick William IV.

Honours 
 Knight Grand Cross in the Order of the Red Eagle, 1st Class.
 Knight in the Order Of The Iron Cross (1st Class).
 Knight Grand Cross in the Order of Fidelity, Baden.
 Knight Grand Cross in the Order of the Crown of Bavaria
 Knight Grand Cross in the Legion of Honour.
 Knight Grand Cross in the Order of the Lion of Hesse.
 Knight Grand Cross in the Order of Saint Stephen of Hungary.
 Knight Grand Cross in the Order of Alexander Nevsky
 Knight Grand Cross in the Order of Saint Anna
 Knight Grand Cross in the Order of Merit of Saxony-Anhalt
 Knight Grand Cross in the Order of Saints Maurice and Lazarus
 Knight Grand Cross in the House Order of Saxe-Ernestine
 Commander of the Order of the Polar Star

Literature
Niels Hegewisch: Die Staatsphilosophie von Johann Peter Friedrich Ancillon (2010).

References

1767 births
1837 deaths
Politicians from Berlin
People from the Margraviate of Brandenburg
Prussian politicians
Foreign ministers of Prussia
German Calvinist and Reformed Christians
University of Geneva alumni
Members of the Prussian Academy of Sciences